National Route 123 is a national highway of Japan connecting Utsunomiya and Mito, Ibaraki in Japan, with a total length of 70 km (43.5 mi).

History
Route 123 was originally designated on 18 May 1953 from Chiba to Mito. This was redesignated Route 51 on 1 April 1963 and the current Route 123 was designated the same day.

See also

References

External links

123
Roads in Ibaraki Prefecture
Roads in Tochigi Prefecture